In The Name of the King 3: The Last Mission is a 2014 action fantasy film co-produced and directed by Uwe Boll. Starring Dominic Purcell, it is the third entry in the series, and the sequel to 2011's In the Name of the King 2: Two Worlds.

Plot 
Hazen Kaine (Dominic Purcell) is a ruthless modern-day assassin, wanting out, and determined to quit the business after carrying out one last job involving a European royal family; kidnapping the two daughters. Hazen easily completes this task, and locks the two girls in a connex box and discovers that one of the girls is wearing a necklace with a charm that looks similar to a tattoo he has and takes the charm from the young girl, which opens a portal to the Middle Ages.

Once there Hazen soon gains his bearing and realizes quickly that a village before him is being attacked by a dragon. Hazen runs to the village when he see that the dragon has noticed him and now attacks him too. He uses his pistol to fire at the dragon. When two sisters Arabella (Ralitsa Paskaleva), and Emeline (Daria Simeonova) notice this, they call to him and bring him into their home for safety. The sisters soon take him to their shaman where he finds out he was chosen to return to the Middle Ages and bring back order to a kingdom in chaos.

Hazen comes to realize that he must stand against the evil King Tervon (Marian Valev), who has seized the kingdom for himself. He and the sisters form an army and head for Tervon's castle, but are ambushed by the king's armies. After a serious battle Hazen faces and easily defeats Tervon in a duel. It is also revealed the dragon which attacked the village earlier is actually controlled by Tervon, who calls upon it to make his escape when he is defeated in the duel against Hazen. Now Hazen finds himself up against an evil king, his armies, and the dragon he controls as Hazen now realizes he must fight on the side of good. He and Arabella finally reach Tervon's castle and Hazen defeats and kills him with ease.

Arabella tells him he must save the girls he locked in the connex box. Hazen returns to his time, but the dragon now under no ones control follows him trying to kill him. The men who hired him are trying to kill him as well. He finds the man who hired him holding the girls at gunpoint. He fights the remaining henchmen and one of them is carried off by the dragon, which heads off some place unknown. Hazen returns the girls home, and their father allows him to leave unharmed; to which Hazen thanks him in return and walks off. In the final shot, the dragon is seen flying overhead in the background.

Cast
 Dominic Purcell as Hazen Kaine
 Ralitsa Paskaleva as Arabella
 Daria Simeonova as Emeline
 Marian Valev as King Tervon

References

External links 
 
 

20th Century Fox direct-to-video films
2010s fantasy adventure films
2014 direct-to-video films
2014 films
American direct-to-video films
American fantasy adventure films
American sword and sorcery films
Canadian fantasy adventure films
English-language Canadian films
Canadian sword and sorcery films
Direct-to-video sequel films
2010s English-language films
Films about time travel
Films based on role-playing video games
Films directed by Uwe Boll
Films set in castles
Live-action films based on video games
Works based on Microsoft video games
2010s American films
2010s Canadian films